Herbert Wilson (22 May 1892 – 3 June 1972) was an English first-class cricketer active 1911–34 who played for Nottinghamshire. He was born in Eastwood, Nottinghamshire; died in Macclesfield.

References

1892 births
1972 deaths
English cricketers
Nottinghamshire cricketers
Cheshire cricketers